Scott K. Silverman is a professor of chemistry at the University of Illinois at Urbana-Champaign. He joined the Department of Chemistry in 2000 as Assistant Professor, was promoted to Associate Professor with tenure in 2006, and was promoted to Professor in 2010.

His main research interest is in the identification, characterization, and application of deoxyribozymes, DNA used as a catalyst.

References

University of Illinois Urbana-Champaign faculty
21st-century American chemists
Living people
1972 births